On a Good Night is the second studio album by American country music artist Wade Hayes. Released in 1996 on Columbia Records Nashville, it produced a #2-peaking single on the Billboard Hot Country Singles & Tracks (now Hot Country Songs) charts in its title track that year. Like his previous album Old Enough to Know Better, On a Good Night also received gold certification in the U.S. for sales of more than 500,000 copies.

"Undo the Right" was previously recorded by Willie Nelson on his 1962 album And Then I Wrote, "Hurts Don't It" by Greg Holland on his 1994 debut album Let Me Drive, and "Our Time Is Coming" by Brooks & Dunn on their 1993 album Hard Workin' Man.

Track listing

Personnel
As listed in liner notes.

Bruce C. Bouton – pedal steel guitar, slide guitar
Dennis Burnside – piano, Hammond organ
Mark Casstevens – acoustic guitar
Rob Hajacos – fiddle, "assorted hoedown tools"
Wade Hayes – lead vocals, acoustic guitar, electric guitar
Dave Hoffner – piano
David Hungate – bass guitar
Brent Mason – electric guitar, baritone guitar
John Wesley Ryles – background vocals
Glenn Worf – bass guitar
Dennis Wilson – background vocals
Lonnie Wilson – drums, percussion

Charts

Weekly charts

Year-end charts

Certifications

References

1996 albums
Columbia Records albums
Wade Hayes albums
Albums produced by Don Cook